The Tennessee Volunteers men's cross country program represents the University of Tennessee located in Knoxville, Tennessee.  The men's program competes in the National Collegiate Athletic Association (NCAA) Division I and the Southeastern Conference (SEC).  The men's cross country team officially started in 1924.

Coaching staff 
Under his mentor he has developed 25 All-SEC citations, 13 All-SEC or All-South Region, three SEC All-Freshman honorees and three All-America performers. In July 2011 it was announced that Watts had been released and that J.J. Clark would take over the men's cross country team effectively merging all of Tennessee's track & field and cross country programs. In May 2014, it was announced by Athletic Director Dave Hart that Director of Track and Field/Cross Country JJ Clark would not be retained. Later, in June 2014, it was announced that Beth Alford-Sullivan would be the next Director of Track and Field/Cross Country at the University of Tennessee. This hire made her the first female SEC coach of any men's team. In May 2022, Alford-Sullivan was fired, and former Notre Dame coach Sean Carlson was hired to lead the men's and women's cross country teams and the distance runners. In Carlson's first year as head coach, he led them to their best finish (2nd) at the SEC Championships since 1999, their first NCAA South Regional title since 2002 (where they outperformed SEC Champion Alabama by 34 points), and returned the Vols to the NCAA Championships for the first time since 2005, where they finished 20th.

Team history 
The Tennessee Volunteers program began competing in 1924. It was not until 1962 that the team gained its first coach, Chuck Rohe. Under his guidance the Vols reached new heights winning multiple SEC regular season and tournament championships. Under his guidance the Vols reached their first NCAA Tournament appearance in 1963 where they finished 5th, he would then lead the team to four more NCAA appearances until he left the team in 1968. The team found more success with the hire of Stan Huntsman who led UT to many trips to the NCAA Tournament and won the Volunteers their first and only national title. From 1962-2009 the team has amassed a 201-38-1 record in team dual meets earning them a .840 winning percentage.

Home courses 
The Lambert Acres Golf Club was previously the site of home cross country meets for the Volunteers from 1998-2013. The course still serves as a 27-hole golf course, and is nestled in the foothills of the Great Smoky Mountains and boasts 9,525 yards. Throughout its run, the course hosted the Tennessee Invitational 10 times, the NCAA South Regional in 2002, 2006 and
2008, and Southeastern Conference Championship in 1998. In 2014, the Vols moved much closer to home with the opening of the new Cherokee Farm Cross Country Course on Alcoa highway across the Tennessee River from the main UT campus. The course served as the practice venue for the team in 2014 and 2015, before finally serving in competition for the 2016 season. The course has two loops, one that is 2k and the other is 1k. The course was designed specifically for viewers to use the small loop, where it is ensured that runners have to pass the same point at least three times in a race.

Year-by-Year results

*Through November 11, 2022.
*Note: records from 1924-1961 are inaccurate
 Sources

Note: In 2020, due to COVID-19, the cross country season was shortened, and NCAA regionals were not held, as teams advanced straight to the championships.

All-Americans 

Tennessee has a total of 17 men's cross country All-Americans

Ron Addison, 1976
Jamie Barnes, 1991
Doug Brown, 1972, 1973
Tony Cosey, 1994, 1995
Rick Cummins, 1988
Pat Davey, 1978
Doug Ellington, 1998
Stewart Ellington, 1994
Alf Holmberg, 1951
David Krafsur, 1985
Glenn Morgan, 1989, 1990
Peter Okwera, 2012
Rickey Pittman, 1981
Bob Redington, 1965
Zach Sabatino, 2005
Doug Tolson, 1983, 1984
George Watts, 1977
Todd Williams, 1988, 1989, 1990

See also 
Tennessee men's track and field
Tennessee women's track and field
Tennessee women's cross country

References

External links
 

Men